Kachalabad or Kachalobad may refer to:
 Kachalabad, Kermanshah
 Kachalabad, Sardasht, West Azerbaijan Province
 Kachalabad, alternate name of Kachaleh, West Azerbaijan, Urmia County, West Azerbaijan Province